Romeo is a 2011 Bengali romantic comedy-drama film directed by Sujit Mondol and starring Dev and Subhashree Ganguly in lead roles with Sabyasachi Chakrabarty, Laboni Sarkar, Kaushik Banerjee in supporting roles, whilst the music was scored by critically acclaimed Jeet Ganguly. Third time where Dev and Subhashree Ganguly work together after the films, Challenge and Paran Jai Jaliya Re. The film was released on 4 November 2011. It is an official remake of the Telugu blockbuster movie Konchem Ishtam Konchem Kashtam. Romeo was a Mixed review.

Plot
This story is set in the backdrop of a village where Pooja (Subhashree Ganguly) grows under the shade of her doting father Chatterjee (Kaushik Banerjee) who takes care of everything for her and she is equally attached to him. She comes to Kolkata for her further studies and stays at her uncle Dibakar's (Biswajit Chakraborty) house. There, her cousin Swati has a group of friends and one among them is the happy and playful Siddhartha, or Siddhu (Dev).

Siddhu is a big Casanova among girls and though he always has a smile on his face, there is a sad past as his mother Nandini (Laboni Sarkar) is living separately from his father Aviraj Roy (Sabyasachi Chakrabarty).

Both of Siddhu's parents had a love marriage. Eventually, both Siddhu and Pooja fall in love and the time comes for Siddhu to ask Pooja's hand in marriage. Mr. Chatterjee says that if Siddhu can unite his parents and get them together, he would be willing to accept the proposal.

From then on start the efforts and trials of both Siddhu and Pooja to get Aviraj and Nandini together. One night, when Aviraj is driving Siddhu to his mother's home, they talk about when his parents separated. His father understands his feelings and what he's trying to say, and his father answers "that he couldn't have done anything, his mother just left him." To this Siddhu answers, "No, you should have gone after her. You should have never let her go." Even after this talk with Aviraj, Pooja and Siddhu have many failures, but eventually Siddhu unites his parents together and Pooja's father, Chatterjee, also unites the other lovers, Pooja and Siddhu.

Cast
 Dev as Siddharth Roy
 Subhashree Ganguly as Pooja Chatterjee
 Sabyasachi Chakrabarty as Aviraj Roy
 Laboni Sarkar as Nandini Roy
 Biswajit Chakraborty as Dibakar (special appearance)
 Kaushik Banerjee as Mr. Chatterjee, Pooja's father
 Parthasarathi Chakraborty as Ratan, Sidhu's friend

Soundtrack

References

External links 
 

Bengali-language Indian films
2010s Bengali-language films
2011 romantic comedy-drama films
2011 films
Bengali remakes of Telugu films
Films scored by Jeet Ganguly
Indian romantic comedy-drama films
2011 comedy films
2011 drama films